State Trunk Highway 114 (often called Highway 114, STH-114 or WIS 114) is a state highway in the U.S. state of Wisconsin. It runs east–west in east central Wisconsin from Neenah to Hilbert. The highway ran from Neenah to Brillion before about 1986, when the section from Hilbert to Brillion was turned back to Calumet County, which now maintains it as County Trunk Highway PP (CTH-PP).

Route description

Starting at Interstate 41/US Highway 41 (I-41/US 41) in Neenah, WIS 114 starts to travel eastward along Winneconne Avenue. As it reaches downtown, WIS 114 transitions north onto Commercial Street. As it enters Menasha, WIS 114 transitions onto Washington Avenue and then onto Tayco Street. It then turns east along Third Street, intersects WIS 47, and then northeast along Plank Road.

After the road bends east, WIS 114 then begins to run concurrently with US 10. After that, the road transitions from a five-lane undivided road to a four-lane divided road. Then, WIS 114 branches southeastward away from US 10. As it almost enters Sherwood, it then begins to run concurrently with WIS 55. Then, in the middle of Sherwood, they bend south-southwestward. As they are about to leave Sherwood, WIS 114 turns southward. After that, WIS 114 turns eastward towards Hilbert to intersect with WIS 32/WIS 57. At this intersection in Hilbert, WIS 114 ends.

Major intersections

See also

References

External links

114
Transportation in Winnebago County, Wisconsin
Transportation in Calumet County, Wisconsin